Indas Mahavidyalaya, established in 2006, is the General Degree College in Indas, Bankura district, India. It offers undergraduate courses in Arts and Sciences. It is affiliated to  Bankura University.

Departments

Bachelor of Science

Honours
Mathematics

Pass
Mathematics
Chemistry
Physics
Zoology
Botany
Computer Science
Environmental Science

Bachelor of Arts

Honours
Bengali
English
Sanskrit
History

Pass
Bengali
English
Sanskrit
Philosophy
History

Others
Physical Education
The NSS Unit

Admission
Admission to the first year undergraduate classes is usually held after the publication of the result of the Higher Secondary Examination under the West Bengal Council for Higher Secondary Examination in the months of May and June every year, and is based on merit through open counseling and online counseling procedures.

Accreditation
The college is recognized by the University Grants Commission (UGC).

See also

References

External links 
Indas Mahavidyalaya

Universities and colleges in Bankura district
Colleges affiliated to Bankura University
Educational institutions established in 2006
2006 establishments in West Bengal